Rédei is a Hungarian surname. Notable people with the surname include:

George Rédei (1921–2008), Hungarian plant biologist
László Rédei, Hungarian mathematician
Viktória Rédei Soós (born 1985), Hungarian handballer

Hungarian-language surnames